2nd Mounted Brigade may refer to:
2nd (2nd South Midland) Mounted Brigade, designation given to the 2nd South Midland Mounted Brigade while serving with the 2nd Mounted Division in the Gallipoli Campaign
2nd Mounted Brigade (United Kingdom), also known as 2/2nd South Western Mounted Brigade
2nd Mounted Brigade (Canada)